Men Men Men is a 1995 Italian comedy-drama film directed by Christian De Sica. The film, a comedy about four friends, was the first mainstream Italian film dealing with gay lifestyles.

Cast
Christian De Sica as Vittorio Mannino
Massimo Ghini as Sandro Di Nepi
Leo Gullotta as Tony Piraino
Alessandro Haber as Dado Piccioni
Monica Scattini as Simonetta
Paco Reconti as Luca
Paolo Conticini as Alex Giannetti
Paolo Gasparini as Michele
Carlo Croccolo as Peppino
Fabrizia Sacchi as Anna Farnesi
Lucia Guzzardi as Tony's mother

Reception
Leo Gullotta announced he was gay during promotion for the film.

The film received poor reviews but opened on 95 screens in Italy and placed third for the weekend behind Nell and Wes Craven's New Nightmare with a gross of 935 million lire ($584,111). In its second weekend it moved to number one.

References

External links

1995 films
Films directed by Christian De Sica
Films scored by Manuel De Sica
1990s Italian-language films
1995 comedy films
Italian comedy-drama films
Gay-related films
Italian LGBT-related films
1995 LGBT-related films
LGBT-related comedy-drama films
1990s Italian films